Andrew G. Walder (born 1953) is an American political sociologist specializing in the study of Chinese society. He has taught at Harvard University and Stanford University, where he joined the faculty in 1997 and is the Denise O'Leary & Kent Thiry Professor of the School of Humanities and Sciences, and a Senior Fellow of the Freeman-Spogli Institute for International Studies at Stanford University.

His research interests include Collective Action, Social Movements, Comparative and Historical Sociology, and Political Sociology. He has published extensively on the Chinese Cultural Revolution, Chinese industry and industrial reform, and Chinese society under Mao Zedong.

Education and career
Walder was born in 1953. He received his PhD in sociology at the University of Michigan in 1981 and taught at Columbia University before moving to Harvard in 1987, where he headed the MA Program on Regional Studies-East Asia for several years. From 1995 to 1997, he headed the Division of Social Sciences at the Hong Kong University of Science and Technology. He joined that Stanford Department of Sociology in 1997. From 1996 to 2006, as a member of the Hong Kong Government's Research Grants Council, he chaired its Panel on the Humanities, Social Sciences, and Business Studies.

In 1985, he was awarded a Guggenheim Fellowship in the field of sociology.

Selected publications
Andrew G. Walder, China Under Mao: A Revolution Derailed. Cambridge, Mass.: Harvard University Press, 2015.

Fractured Rebellion: The Beijing Red Guard Movement. Cambridge, Mass.: Harvard University Press, 2009.
Joseph W. Esherick, Paul G. Pickowicz, and Andrew G. Walder, eds., The Chinese Cultural Revolution as History. Stanford: Stanford University Press, 2006.
Jean C. Oi and Andrew G. Walder, eds. Property Rights and Economic Reform in China. Stanford: Stanford University Press, 1999.
Andrew G. Walder, ed. Zouping in Transition: The Process of Reform in Rural North China. Cambridge, Mass.: Harvard University Press, 1998.
Andrew G. Walder, ed., China's Transitional Economy. Oxford: Oxford University Press, 1996.
Andrew G. Walder, ed., The Waning of the Communist State: Economic Origins of Political Decline in China and Hungary. Berkeley: University of California Press, 1995.
Andrew G. Walder, Communist Neo-Traditionalism: Work and Authority in Chinese Industry. Berkeley: University of California Press, 1986.

References

External links 
 VITA Andrew G. Walder

1953 births
Political sociologists
Historians of the Cultural Revolution
Stanford University faculty
Johns Hopkins University alumni
University of Michigan alumni
Living people